Miral is a surname and a unisex given name. People with the name include:

People
Miral Samardžić (born 1987), Slovenian football player
Miral al-Tahawy (born 1968), Egyptian novelist

Fictional characters
Miral, main character in the 2010 French film Miral
Marthe Miral, fictional Francophone author

Slovene masculine given names
Arabic feminine given names
Unisex given names